Chelsea Fringe is a garden festival in London which is run in parallel with the Chelsea Flower Show.  It consists of a variety of events and displays at locations across London.  It was started in 2012 by Tim Richardson and is run by volunteers.  In 2012, events included guerrilla gardening, a bicycle beer garden and oranges and lemons at Shoreditch.

In 2013, the fringe expanded to about 200 separate events, with the core site being a pop-up park at Battersea Power Station.  Ben Dark, reviewing for The Daily Telegraph, described the fringe as a "sprawling mess" but praised most of the exhibits which he visited, such as the Gnome Invasion of Ockendon Road, the Dalston Eastern Curve Garden, and the Office Garden in Buckingham Palace Road.

References

External links
Official site

Horticultural exhibitions
Festivals in London
Garden festivals in England
2012 establishments in England
Recurring events established in 2012